Money Magazine is a business news and financial programme that is broadcast on Fridays at 8:00 pm in Hong Kong by television channel TVB Pearl. Its re-run is aired after 11 am the next day. The show is also available on TVB News and MyTVSuper mobile apps, and on TVB's website.

After 22 years on air, the final episode of Money Magazine was aired on 29 June 2018. The successor of the program is Pearl Magazine, which merges Money Magazine and the current affairs program The Pearl Report on the channel.

Producers and reporters
The Money Magazine team is made up of executive producer Michael Wong and reporters. As of 2018, they are:

Melissa Gecolea 
Alice Kan
Zela Chin
Jennifer Chan
Natalie Cheng

TVB
TVB original programming
English-language television shows